Orlin Jared Vallecillo Paguada (born 1 July 1983) is a Honduran professional footballer who plays as a goalkeeper for Liga Nacional club Honduras Progreso.

Club career
Vallecillo started his career at Marathón and played for Hispano and Real España. In December 2008 he moved to Real Juventud with whom he got relegated in May 2009 before returning to Hispano a month later and then Marathón ahead of the 2010 Clausura. He joined Victoria for the 2012 Clausura and Honduras Progreso for the 2013 Apertura.

International career
Vallecillo made his debut for Honduras in a March 2007 friendly match against El Salvador, when he came on as a late sub for Noel Valladares, and has earned a total of 8 caps, scoring no goals. He has represented his country at the 2007 CONCACAF Gold Cup and was a non-playing squad member at the 2011 CONCACAF Gold Cup.

His final international was an August 2007 friendly match against El Salvador.

Personal life
His brother, Erick Vallecillo, has also played for Real España and the national team.

References

External links

1983 births
Living people
People from Colón Department (Honduras)
Association football goalkeepers
Honduran footballers
Honduras international footballers
2007 CONCACAF Gold Cup players
2011 CONCACAF Gold Cup players
2015 CONCACAF Gold Cup players
C.D. Marathón players
Hispano players
Real C.D. España players
C.D. Real Juventud players
C.D. Victoria players
C.D. Honduras Progreso players
Liga Nacional de Fútbol Profesional de Honduras players